Mary Jane (also as slay bar shoes or doll shoes) is an American term (formerly a registered trademark) for a closed, low-cut shoe with one or more straps across the instep.

Classic Mary Janes for children are typically made of black leather or patent leather, have one thin strap fastened with a buckle or button, a broad and rounded toe box, low heels, and thin outsoles. Among girls, Mary Janes are commonly worn with tights, pantyhose, socks, or completely without them (on bare feet), and a dress or a skirt and blouse. Among boys (less common), Mary Janes are traditionally worn with socks (or without them as well), short trousers and a shirt.

History
Children's shoes secured by a strap over the instep and fastened with a buckle or button appeared in the early 20th century. Originally worn by both sexes, they began to be perceived as being mostly for girls during the 1930s in North America and the 1940s in Europe. They were also popular with women in the 1920s.

Today, Mary Janes for children, particularly the more classic styles, are often considered semi-formal or formal shoes, appropriate for school (many schools worldwide require that girls wear them with their uniform), religious ceremonies, weddings, visits, and birthday parties for example. More modern styles are also worn in casual settings, however: playgrounds, shopping centres, sports (Mary Jane sneakers), etc. Although less popular than in the past, Mary Janes remain a timeless classic of children's fashion and, for many people, a symbol of girlhood.

Moreover, Mary Janes are a preferred accessory of many traditional or folk costumes, such as those of the flamenco female dancer and of the typical woman in Mao's China and the Kims' North Korea.

Etymology
Mary Jane was a character created by Richard Felton Outcault, "Father of the Sunday Comic Strip", for his comic strip Buster Brown, which was first published in 1902. She was the sister of the title character Buster Brown and was drawn from real life, as she was also Outcault's daughter of the same name. In Outcault's and his daughter's words, she was the only character drawn from life in the Buster Brown strip although "Mrs. Brown" resembled Outcault's wife.

In 1904, Outcault traveled to the St. Louis World's Fair and sold licenses to up to 200 companies to use the Buster Brown characters to advertise their products. Among them was the Brown Shoe Company, which later hired actors to tour the country, performing as the Buster Brown characters in theaters and stores. This strategy helped the Brown Shoe Company become the most prominently associated brand with the Buster Brown characters. The style of shoe both Buster Brown and Mary Jane wore came to be known by her name, Mary Jane.

Adult styles
While the classic Mary Jane still retains its wide popularity and appeal, platform style Mary Janes have also evolved since the late 1990s, with 1-cm to 3-cm (½-in to 1-in) outsoles and 8-cm to 13-cm (3-in to 5-in) "chunky" heels, often with exaggerated grommets or buckles. The 1920s-style Mary Janes were a famous part of flappers' ensembles, thus reinforcing the childlike style the flappers had. These styles were especially popular in the United States in the late 1990s and early 2000s, within punk rock, psychobilly and goth subcultures. Many times the wearers would accent the look with knee-high knit socks in dark-colored stripes or patterns and/or some form of hosiery (stockings/pantyhose), and often complete the look with a plaid, pleated schoolgirl-style skirt. 

During the early 2000s, block-heeled Mary Jane shoes were popular in the United Kingdom and were fastened by a rectangular chrome buckle and were made under various brand names such as No Doubt, Koi Couture etc.

Mary Janes are a popular part of kinderwhore and Lolita fashion. A pump with a strap across the instep may be referred to as a "Mary Jane pump", although it does not have the low heels or wide toe of the original Mary Jane (and a pump is generally strapless by definition).

Gallery

See also 
 
T-bar sandal—a very similar style

References

1940s fashion
1950s fashion
1960s fashion
2000s fashion
Shoes
1902 in comics
Fictional costumes